A layer in a deep learning model is a structure or network topology in the model's architecture, which takes information from the previous layers and then passes it to the next layer. There are several famous layers in deep learning, namely convolutional layer and maximum pooling layer in the convolutional neural network, fully connected layer and ReLU layer in vanilla neural network, RNN layer in the RNN model and deconvolutional layer in autoencoder etc.

Differences with layers of the neocortex
There is an intrinsic difference between deep learning layering and neocortical layering: deep learning layering depends on network topology, while neocortical layering depends on intra-layers homogeneity.

Dense layer

Dense layer, also called fully-connected layer, refers to the layer whose inside neurons connect to every neuron in the preceding layer.

See also
Deep Learning
Neocortex#Layers

References

Artificial neural networks